Ademuz is an album by jazz saxophonist and flautist Perico Sambeat.

Music and recording
The album was recorded in Valencia in August and November 1995. The compositions, all by Sambeat, are Latin jazz in style. Vocalist Enrique Morente appears on three tracks. The title track has "hard-hitting, quasi-fusion groove and keyboard, electric bass, and overdriven guitar textures, all of which give way to an acoustic ambience as the tune progresses."

Sambeat was also producer for the album.

Reception
The Penguin Guide to Jazz described it as "overcrowded with detail and noise", but concluded that it is "a charismatic and frequently exciting record."

Track listing
All compositions by Perico Sambeat.

"A Free K" – 9:56
"Ademuz" – 8:33
"Tu Rostro Oculto" – 8:17
"Expedición" – 9:03
"La Noche De Lemuria" – 6:07
"Porta Do Ferro" – 7:17
"Barri De La Coma" – 6:22

Personnel
 Perico Sambeat – alto sax, flute
 Brad Mehldau – piano
 Mark Turner – tenor sax
 Michael Leonhart – trumpet
 Kurt Rosenwinkel – guitar
 Joe Martin – bass
 Jorge Rossy – drums
 Enric Canada, Guillermo McGuill – percussion
 Enrique Morente – vocals

References

1998 albums
Perico Sambeat albums